First Presbyterian Church is a historic Presbyterian church located at La Grange, Lewis County, Missouri. It was built in 1848, and is a one-story, temple front, Greek Revival style, red brick building on a raised basement.  It has a gabled roof with an unadorned wood raked cornice and a pediment on the symmetrical façade.

It was listed on the National Register of Historic Places in 2012.

References

Presbyterian churches in Missouri
Churches on the National Register of Historic Places in Missouri
Greek Revival church buildings in Missouri
Churches completed in 1848
Buildings and structures in Lewis County, Missouri
National Register of Historic Places in Lewis County, Missouri